Guiana Amazonian Park is the largest national park of France, aiming at protecting part of the Amazonian forest located in French Guiana which covers 41% of the region. It is the largest park in France as well as the largest park in the European Union and one of the largest national parks in the world.

It cannot be accessed from the seashore or by any means other than airplane or pirogue.

The park has been built on territories belonging to the communes of Camopi, Maripasoula, Papaïchton, Saint-Élie, and Saül.

History 
In the framework of the Earth summit in Rio de Janeiro in 1992, the project of a national park in French Guiana was initiated on June 4, 1992, with the impetus provided by François Mitterrand. This was formalised through a draft agreement signed by the presidents of the general council and of the regional council of French Guiana, and also by the French Ministers of the Environment, of the Overseas Departments and Territories and of Agriculture and Forestry. Following this, in 1993 the Mission for the Creation of the French Guiana National Park was created.

A first project was proposed in late 1995 but was finally rejected in December 1997.

On June 21, 1998, the Twenké agreement led to the recognition of the rights of the native Amerindians and of the Businengue (Maroons) living within the future park's boundaries.

The final project was presented in early 2006. On March 6, 2006, the decree relating to the project of the national park being taken into account was published in the Official Journal of the French Republic. Within it, the national park's name was switched to Guiana Amazonian Park.

The creation of the park was made effective by decree on February 28, 2007, despite the reluctance of several protagonists involved (general council and regional council of French Guiana). The park's governing body met for the first time on June 7, 2007.

Extent 

Within the  central area, maximal protection is enforced and gold mining is strictly forbidden. However, the lands of the Aluku, Wayana, Wayampi and Teko tribes in Camopi, Maripasoula and Papaïchton do not belong to this core area. The Teko considered it a restriction of their free movement, and the Aluku objected to restrictions to their sacred areas. The restriction of all previously acquired rights of the tribal inhabitants, resulted the exception of the inhabited tribal zone.

References

Bibliography

External links 
 Official website

Camopi
Environment of French Guiana
Geography of French Guiana
Maripasoula
National parks of France
Papaichton
Protected areas established in 2007
Protected areas of French Guiana
Saint-Élie
Saül, French Guiana
Tourist attractions in French Guiana